Zachary Zandi (born July 18, 1996) is an American soccer player who plays as a midfielder for Colorado Springs Switchbacks FC in the USL Championship.

Early life
Zandi played youth soccer for West Chester United and Penn Fusion Soccer Academy before joining the Philadelphia Union Academy, and attended Henderson High School. Zandi was a part of Philadelphia Union's under-17 team that won the 2012 Generation Adidas Cup.

College career
Zandi played college soccer for Villanova University, where in four seasons he made 63 appearances, scored 14 goals and provided 10 assists, leading the team with seven goals scored in 2018 and receiving Big East honors throughout his collegiate career. In 2016, Zandi notably helped the Wildcats reach their first NCAA Division I Men's Soccer Tournament in program history.

Club career

Early career
Zandi joined Reading United AC in 2016 while in college where he made 24 appearances, scored two goals and provided five assists in three seasons, while also making three appearances in the U.S. Open Cup.

Philadelphia Union II
Zandi was acquired by Philadelphia Union II on January 8, 2019 and made his club debut for the then Bethlehem Steel in their season opener on March 10, 2019, scoring a goal in his debut and earning USL Championship Team-of-the-Week honors for his performance.

Colorado Springs Switchbacks
On December 21, 2020, Zandi joined the Colorado Springs Switchbacks ahead of the 2021 USL Championship season. He scored his first goal for the club on July 17, 2021 in a league match against San Antonio FC. The following season, Zandi scored five goals during the regular season and provided an assist in the conference semifinal to help lead the Switchbacks to their first-ever conference final. Zandi received the number 10 jersey ahead of the 2023 season and scored a goal in their home opener on March 18, 2023 against Hartford Athletic.

International career

Youth
Zandi was a pool player for the US Soccer national training center since 2010.

Style of play
Zandi has been praised for his attacking movement, combinations, and ability to create scoring chances.

Personal life
His sister, Sydney Zandi, played college soccer for the University of Virginia and has played for the United States women's national under-17, under-18 and under-19 soccer teams, including representing the United States at the 2016 FIFA U-17 Women's World Cup. His father Karl Zandi played college soccer for West Chester University and his uncle Peter played college soccer for the University of Pennsylvania.

Honors

Individual
2015 Big East All-Freshman Team
2016 Big East All-Academic Team
2016 Big East Honor Roll
2017 Philadelphia Soccer Six Player of the Year
2018 All-Big East Second Team

References

External links
Profile at Villanova

1996 births
Living people
American soccer players
American people of Iranian descent
Sportspeople of Iranian descent
Association football midfielders
Philadelphia Union II players
People from West Chester, Pennsylvania
Reading United A.C. players
Soccer players from Pennsylvania
Sportspeople from Chester County, Pennsylvania
USL Championship players
USL League Two players
Villanova Wildcats men's soccer players
Colorado Springs Switchbacks FC players
Zandi family (United States)